Bronston is a surname. Notable people with the surname include:

Douglas Bronston (1887–1951), American screenwriter and writer
Jack E. Bronston (1922–2017), American lawyer and politician 
Samuel Bronston (1908–1994), Bessarabian-born American film producer and director

See also
Bronson (disambiguation)